John "Jack" Bennett (birth unknown – death unknown) was an English professional rugby league footballer who played in the 1920s and 1930s.

Playing career

International honours
Jack Bennett won caps for England while at Rochdale Hornets in 1924 against Other Nationalities, in 1925 against Wales, while at Wigan in 1926 against Wales, Other Nationalities, and won caps for Great Britain while at Rochdale Hornets in 1924 against Australia (3 matches), New Zealand (3 matches), and while at Wigan in 1926 against New Zealand.

Championship final appearances
Jack Bennett played  in Wigan's 22-10 victory over Warrington in the Championship Final during the 1925–26 season at Knowsley Road, St. Helens on Saturday 8 May 1926.

County League appearances
Jack Bennett played in Wigan's victory  in the Lancashire County League during the 1925–26 season.

Challenge Cup Final appearances
Jack Bennett played  in Rochdale Hornets' 10-9 victory over Hull F.C. in the 1922 Challenge Cup Final during the 1921–22 season at Headingley Rugby Stadium, Leeds on Saturday 6 May 1922, in front of a crowd of 32,596, and played  in Wigan's 13-2 victory over Dewsbury in the 1929 Final during the 1928–29 season at Wembley Stadium, London on Saturday 4 May 1929.

County Cup Final appearances
Jack Bennett played  in Wigan's 11-15 defeat by Swinton in the 1925–26 Lancashire County Cup Final during the 1925–26 season at The Cliff, Broughton on Wednesday 9 December 1925, and played  in the 5-4 victory over Widnes in the 1928–29 Lancashire County Cup Final during the 1928–29 season at The Willows, Salford on Saturday 24 November 1928,

References

External links

England national rugby league team players
English rugby league players
Great Britain national rugby league team players
Rochdale Hornets players
Rugby league hookers
Wigan Warriors players
Year of birth missing
Year of death missing
Place of birth missing
Place of death missing